Minister for Emergency Services is a position in the government of Western Australia, currently held by Fran Logan of the Labor Party. A separate emergency services portfolio was first created in 1982, for the government of Ray O'Connor. It has often been held by the Minister of Police, and on two occasions (from 1983 to 1990 and from 2001 to 2008) the two portfolios were merged under a single Minister for Police and Emergency Services. The current minister is responsible for the state government's Department of Fire and Emergency Services (DFES).

Titles
 25 January 1982 – present: Minister for Emergency Services

List of ministers

See also
 Minister for Police (Western Australia)
 Minister for Road Safety (Western Australia)

References
 David Black (2014), The Western Australian Parliamentary Handbook (Twenty-Third Edition). Perth [W.A.]: Parliament of Western Australia.

Emergency
Minister for Emergency Services